The 12905 / 12906 Shalimar–Porbandar Superfast Express is a Superfast train of Indian Railways, running between  in West Bengal and  in Gujarat. The train is named Aradhana Express by Indian Railway. The train is very much important and popular train in the route and connects eastern India to extreme west part of country. The train is as important as Jnaneshwari Express.

It is currently being operated with 12905/12906 train numbers on a bi-weekly basis.

Coach composition

The train has standard ICF rakes with max speed of 110 kmph. The train consists of 23 coaches:

 1 AC First Class
 1 AC II Tier
 5 AC III Tier
 10 Sleeper coaches
 1 Pantry car
 4 General Unreserved
 2 Seating cum Luggage Rake

Service

The 12905/Porbandar–Shalimar Superfast Express has an average speed of 60 km/hr and covers 2544 km in 42 hrs 30 mins. 
The 12906/Shalimar–Porbandar Superfast Express has an average speed of 60 km/hr and covers 2544 km in 42 hrs 35 mins.

Route

The important halts of the train are:

 
 
 
 
 
 
 
 
 
 
 
  (Amravati)

Schedule

Traction

From Ahmedabad to Porbandar, the train is hauled by WDM-3A locomotive of Vatva Loco Shed. Nowadays it is also hauled by a WDP-4D locomotive of Sabarmati Loco Shed.

Gallery

References

Transport in Porbandar
Rail transport in Howrah
Railway services introduced in 2000
Express trains in India
Rail transport in Gujarat
Rail transport in Maharashtra
Rail transport in Chhattisgarh
Rail transport in Odisha
Rail transport in Jharkhand
Rail transport in West Bengal